The Shards of Heaven is a 2015 historical fantasy debut novel by Michael Livingston. It chronicles Octavian's war against Mark Antony and Cleopatra, seen from the perspective of the minor historical figures who surround them.

Plot
Years after the murder of Julius Caesar, his adopted son Octavian has succeeded him as a powerful force in Rome, if only as a senator with a large personal army. Octavian is somewhat threatened by the existence of Caesarion, Caesar's son by the Egyptian queen Cleopatra, who is himself Pharaoh alongside his mother. Octavian's nemesis Mark Antony has left Italy for Egypt, where he has fathered three children with Cleopatra, and his declaration of Caesarion as Caesar's legitimate heir incites war with Rome. Meanwhile, Caesar's other adopted son, Juba, has found the fabled Trident of Poseidon, a magical artifact with unearthly destructive power. He intends to use it—and the other so-called "Shards of Heaven"—to avenge himself on Rome for the death of his natural father, the king of Numidia.

Characters
 Juba, son and heir to the king of Numidia, adopted by Julius Caesar after his conquest of Numidia
 Octavian, Caesar's adopted son and heir
 Cleopatra, Queen of Egypt
 Mark Antony, former Roman general and Triumvir
 Caesarion, son of Caesar and Cleopatra
 Cleopatra Selene, daughter of Cleopatra and Antony, twin to Helios
 Alexander Helios, son of Cleopatra and Antony, twin to Selene
 Ptolemy Philadelphus, son of Cleopatra and Antony
 Lucius Vorenus and Titus Pullo, Roman centurions formerly loyal to Julius Caesar, now in the service of Antony
 Didymus Chalcenterus, chief librarian of the Library of Alexandria and tutor to Cleopatra's children

Writing and publication
Livingston, a historian and professor of medieval literature, had been writing fiction for years while publishing multiple academic works. He wrote The Shards of Heaven during the decade after the publication of his first short story in 2005. Asked about his choice of setting, Livingston said:

Noting that "The Shards of Heaven is intended to fall in the gray area between legend and history", Livingston said that while researching the novel he read "a great many articles and studies that might bring most folk to tears: from scholarly arguments about the construction of Roman triremes to countless ancient descriptions of places like the Great Lighthouse or the Tomb of Alexander the Great."

Livingston previewed the cover of The Shards of Heaven on his website in March 2015. He said that the image, created by Larry Ronstant, was inspired by the covers of Bernard Cornwell historical novels such as 1356, and features "roughed up" Roman centurion armor as would have been worn by Vorenus and Pullo. The Shards of Heaven was published on November 24, 2015.

Sequel
In a November 2015 interview, Livingston noted that the sequel to The Shards of Heaven would be called The Temples of the Ark. As of January 2016, the author's web site referred to the second installment as The Gates of Hell.

Critical reception
Publishers Weekly said that "this multipronged tale is dense with action and incident; it’s grounded in history, mythology, and religion, but not weighed down by them." Kirkus Reviews wrote, "Readers with an interest in this era will be captivated by the weaving of fiction with the reality of the past and the weaving of the reality of the past with the magic of the unseen world, even if the religious inquiries of the text aren’t especially fresh." In a blurb featured on the novel's cover, historical novelist Bernard Cornwell called The Shards of Heaven "a brilliant debut", writing that "Livingston has spiced real history with a compelling dose of fantasy! Wonderfully imaginative and beautifully told."

References

External links
 
 

2015 American novels
2015 fantasy novels
American fantasy novels
American historical novels
Fictional depictions of Augustus in literature
Fictional depictions of Cleopatra in literature
Cultural depictions of Mark Antony
Novels set in ancient Egypt
Novels set in ancient Rome
Novels set in the 1st century BC
Cultural depictions of Caesarion
Tor Books books